Treat U Right is the only studio album by American pop group BlackGirl, released on May 10, 1994, by RCA Records. It includes the singles "Krazy", "90's Girl", "Where Did We Go Wrong" and a cover of the Staple Singers' "Let's Do It Again".

Track listing

Personnel
Pam Copeland – vocals, background vocals
Nycolia "Tye-V" Turman – vocals, background vocals
Rochelle Stuart – vocals, background vocals
Teddy Riley, Menton Smith, Antwone Dickey, David Roland Williams, Walter Scott, Chris Smith – remix on track 13

Charts
Album - Billboard (North America)

BlackGirl albums
1994 debut albums
RCA Records albums
Albums produced by Tricky Stewart
Albums produced by Teddy Riley